United Nations Security Council resolution 1561 was adopted unanimously on 17 September 2004, after recalling all previous resolutions on the situation in Liberia, particularly resolutions 1497 (2003), 1503 (2003), 1521 (2003) and 1532 (2004). The Council extended the mandate of the United Nations Mission in Liberia (UNMIL) for a further year until 19 September 2005.

The Security Council recognised the important role that the Economic Community of West African States (ECOWAS) was playing in the Liberian process in addition to that of the African Union and United Nations. There had also been substantial progress with regards to disarmament in the disarmament, demobilisation, reintegration and rehabilitation process.

Liberian parties were called upon to commit themselves to the peace process and to ensure the holding of free, fair and transparent general elections by October 2005. Meanwhile, the international community was asked to fulfil pledges made at the International Reconstruction Conference on Liberia in February 2004 and make funds available for the reintegration and rehabilitation process. Finally, the Secretary-General Kofi Annan to report on progress made by UNMIL in the fulfilment of its mandate.

See also
 List of United Nations Security Council Resolutions 1501 to 1600 (2003–2005)
 Second Liberian Civil War

References

External links
 
Text of the Resolution at undocs.org

 1561
 1561
2004 in Liberia
September 2004 events